A Writer's Odyssey is a 2021 Chinese action-adventure fantasy film directed and written by Lu Yang and produced by Ning Hao. The film was released February 12, 2021, on the Lunar New Year. The film is based on Shuang Xuetao's novel of the same name, and its sequel Godslayer.

Plot 
The film follows Guan Ning as he searches for his daughter, believing her to be kidnapped by human traffickers. Soon, a powerful corporation contacts him and offers to find his daughter if he assassinates Lu Kongwen, a young novelist. The plot of his novel involves a young hero attempting to overthrow Redmane, their tyrannical ruler. Somehow, the novel appears to be impacting life in the real world, and the CEO, who suspects it as his bane, wants Lu dead.

Cast 
 Lei Jiayin as Guan Ning
 Yang Mi as Tu Ling
 Dong Zijian as Kongwen Lu, the novelist
 Tong Liya
 Hewei Yu
 Guo Jingfei as Black Armor

Production 
Post-production lasted over two years.

Reception 
On Rotten Tomatoes, the film holds an approval rating of 92% based of 12 reviews, with an average rating of 7.2/10.

Harris Dang of the AU Review gave the film 3.5/5 stars and wrote: "Overall, A Writer's Odyssey is an entertaining thrill ride that provides enough wild action, energy, creativity, and visual splendor to satisfy audiences." Richard Kuipers of Variety said "Odyssey is packed with stunning sights including a 50-ft., four-armed CGI villain but is let down by a script that fails to fashion promising story elements into a consistently compelling whole." 

Narayan Liu of CBR.com gave the film a positive review, praising its visuals, while noting the weak characterization. Lim Yian Lu of Yahoo! Singapore gave the film a positive review, describing it as a "a great action film to watch."

Tay Yek Keak of Today Online gave the film a more negative review, describing it as "basically a viewer's ordeal."

Accolades

References

External links
 

2021 films
2021 fantasy films
2021 action films
2021 adventure films